Abigail Ruston (born April 3, 1983) is an American track and field athlete who specialises in the shot put.

She finished twelfth at the 2006 USA Outdoor Track and Field Championships and improved to sixth place the following year with a personal best throw of 17.47 meters. Coached by James Parman, Ruston received NCAA Outdoor All-America honours in 2007.

She finished as the runner-up to Jillian Camarena at the 2008 USA Indoor Track and Field Championships, throwing a personal best of 18.03 m at the competition. As a result, she was selected for the 2008 IAAF World Indoor Championships and finished in eleventh place, outdoing her compatriot Camarena. In the outdoor season that year, she threw a personal best of 18.13 m in May, but only managed eighth at the 2008 United States Olympic Trials with a throw of 17.41 m.

She is currently training at Texas State University and coached by James Parman

Personal records

All information taken from IAAF profile.

Competition record

References

External links



1983 births
Living people
American female shot putters
21st-century American women